The ARM Cortex-A12 is a 32-bit processor core licensed by ARM Holdings implementing the ARMv7-A architecture.  It provides up to 4 cache-coherent cores.  The Cortex-A12 is a successor to the Cortex-A9.

ARM renamed A12 as a variant of Cortex-A17 since the second revision of the core in early 2014, because they were indistinguishable in performance.

Overview 

ARM claims that the Cortex-A12 core is 40 percent more powerful than the Cortex-A9 core. New features not found in the Cortex-A9 include hardware virtualization and 40-bit Large Physical Address Extensions (LPAE) addressing. It was announced as supporting big.LITTLE, however shortly afterwards the ARM Cortex-A17 was announced as the upgraded version with that capability.

Key features of the Cortex-A12 core are:
 Out-of-order speculative issue superscalar execution pipeline giving 3.00 DMIPS/MHz/core.
 NEON SIMD instruction set extension.
  High performance VFPv4 floating point unit.
 Thumb-2 instruction set encoding reduces the size of programs with little impact on performance.
 TrustZone security extensions.
 L2 cache controller (0-8 MB).
 Multi-core processing.
 40-bit Large Physical Address Extensions (LPAE) addressing up to 1 TB of RAM.
 Hardware virtualization support.

See also

 ARM architecture
 Comparison of ARMv8-A cores
 JTAG
 List of applications of ARM cores
 List of ARM cores

References

External links 
ARM Holdings
 

ARM processors
ARM Holdings IP cores